Belfield is a village in the Demerara-Mahaica Region of Guyana, standing on the Atlantic coast, three kilometres west of Enmore.

The first section of the Demerara-Berbice Railway, from Georgetown to Plaisance, was opened on 3 November 1848. The extension to Belfield was completed in 1854.

Belfield was once home to the Belfield Girls' School, a school for delinquent girls, founded in 1949.

References

Populated places in Demerara-Mahaica